Stephen Nash (born 1956) is a male retired British international butterfly swimmer.

Swimming career
Nash was part of the 1974 England team, where he won a bronze medal for the 4×100 m medley relay at the 1974 Commonwealth Games in Christchurch, New Zealand. He also won a silver medal for the same event for Great Britain at the 1974 European Swimming Championships in Vienna, Austria. He won 100 m butterfly event at the 6 nations tournament in Minsk, USSR in 1976.

See also
 List of Commonwealth Games medallists in swimming (men)

References

English male swimmers
1956 births
Living people
European Aquatics Championships medalists in swimming
People educated at St Philip's School
Swimmers at the 1974 British Commonwealth Games
Commonwealth Games medallists in swimming
Commonwealth Games bronze medallists for England
Medallists at the 1974 British Commonwealth Games